The Abbey of St. Mary of Paris (Abbaye Sainte-Marie de Paris), was a Benedictine Abbey within the Solesmes Congregation, based at 3/5 Rue de la Source in the 16th arrondissement of Paris. It was founded in 1893, as a Priory, before being elevated to the status of an Abbey in 1925. In 2021, the Abbey closed and was sold to the Emmanuel Community, becoming an "international house for the formation of their seminarians".

References 

Christianity in Paris
Religious buildings and structures in Paris